William Fuller (August 2, 1889 – death date unknown) was an American Negro league second baseman in the 1910s.

A native of New York, New York, Fuller made his Negro leagues debut in 1915 with the Cuban Giants. He went on to play for the Bacharach Giants and Hilldale Club.

References

External links
Baseball statistics and player information from Baseball-Reference Black Baseball Stats and Seamheads

1889 births
Year of death missing
Place of death missing
Bacharach Giants players
Cuban Giants players
Hilldale Club players
Baseball second basemen
Baseball players from New York City